Bursina is a genus of sea snails, marine gastropod mollusks in the family Bursidae, the frog shells.

Species
Species within the genus Bursina include:
 Bursina borisbeckeri (Parth, 1996)
 Bursina fernandezi (Beu, 1977)
 Bursina fijiensis (Watson, 1881)
 Bursina gnorima (Melvilll, 1918)
 Bursina ignobilis (Beu, 1987)
 Bursina nobilis (Reeve, 1844)

References

External links

Bursidae